Deacon John may refer to:

 Deacon John Moore, New Orleans guitarist and bandleader
 Deacon John Buffington House, historic house in Swansea, Massachusetts
 Deacon John Moore House, historic house in Windsor, Connecticut
 Deacon John Symmes House, historic house in Winchester, Massachusetts
 Deacon John Troyer (1753–1842), religious figure in the Long Point, Ontario region
 John Deacon, the bassist for the band Queen (credited as Deacon John on its debut album)

See also 
 Deacon Jones (disambiguation)
 John Deacon (disambiguation)

John, Deacon